Imam Abdullahi Abubakar is an Islamic cleric and humanitarian. He is best known for saving the lives of 262 non-Muslim during an attack on his community by bandits.

Early life 
Iman Abdullahi Abubakar was born in 1936 in Bauchi, Bauchi state, Nigeria.

Background 
Imam Abubakar is the Chief Imam of Akwatti Mosque in Nghar, a community in Barkin Ladi local government area of Plateau State. 
In 2018, there was an attack on Yelwan Gindi Akwati, Swei and Nghar villages where 80 persons were killed by suspected bandits. 

The Imam was able to save the lives of 262 people who are majorly Christians from the Birom tribe by hiding them in his mosque thereby preventing the marauding attackers from killing them.

In July 2019, Imam Abdullahi Abubakar received the International Religious Freedom Award from the US Government, which is granted to supporters of religious freedom, together with four other religious leaders from Sudan, Iraq, Brazil, and Cyprus.

In August, President Buhari authorized the inclusion of Imam Abdullahi Abubakar in the membership of the national Ulama committee and was part of an 80-man Ulama committee charged with the responsibility of educating Nigerian pilgrims in Mina during the 2019 Hajj

Awards 
 US International Religious Freedom Award (2019)

 Member of the Order of the Federal Republic (MFR)

 Award of Excellence

Reference 

People from Bauchi State